Gabriel Cânu (born 18 January 1981) is a Romanian former footballer. He was best known for his impressive height, powerful header and aerial game effective both defensively and in attack. He was also regarded for his leadership qualities, becoming captain for Timișoara, Vaslui and Ceahlăul Piatra Neamț. He is now football analyst for Eurosport Romania in Premier League Show covering the top English football league matches, alongside Lucian Sânmărtean and Emanuel Terzian and assistant manager of Metaloglobus București.

Career
Born in Bucharest, Cânu came through the youth ranks of local Național București, going on to finish his sporting formation with the Divizia B teams Cimentul Fieni and FC Baia Mare.

Național
Aged 18, he made his debut in Național's first team on 2 June 1999, coming as a substitute in a 2–0 win against Petrolul Ploiești. It was his only appearance that season. After one season, with no matches, he was loaned two years in a row to Divizia B sides Cimentul Fieni and FC Baia Mare, to build up his first team experience. After he returned, he failed to establish himself in the first team squad.

Cânu made one appearance in the Romanian first league in 1997/1998, while at FC Național. In the 2000/2001 and 2001/2002 seasons he played in the Romanian second league, for Cimentul Fieni and FC Baia Mare respectively. He then returned to FC Național, playing 16 times in the Divizia A during the 2003/2004 season. Cânu joined Poli in the winter break of the 2004/2005 season, together with Național coach Cosmin Olăroiu and teammates Gabriel Caramarin, Gigel Coman and Marius Popa.

Honours

FC Vaslui
UEFA Intertoto Cup: 2008

ACS Poli Timișoara
Liga II: 2014–15

External links
 
 

1981 births
Living people
Footballers from Bucharest
Romanian footballers
Association football defenders
Liga I players
Liga II players
FC Politehnica Timișoara players
FC Progresul București players
CS Minaur Baia Mare (football) players
FC Vaslui players
CSM Ceahlăul Piatra Neamț players
ACS Poli Timișoara players